Graham Anthony Loud  (born 1953) is a professor emeritus of medieval history at the University of Leeds. Loud is a specialist in the history of southern Italy during the Central Middle Ages (tenth to thirteenth centuries), and also in German history in the Staufen period.

Selected publications
Church and Society in the Norman Principality of Capua 1058-1197 (Oxford, Clarendon Press, 1985) xv + 283 pp.
Church and Chronicle in the Middle Ages. Essays Presented to John Taylor, edited by G.A. Loud and I.N. Wood (London, Hambledon, 1991) xxvi + 270 pp.
The History of the Tyrants of Sicily by Hugo Falcandus 1154-69 [with Thomas Wiedemann] (Manchester Medieval Translations 1998), xvii + 286 pp.
Conquerors and Churchmen in Norman Italy (Variorum Collected Studies Series, Aldershot 1999), xii + 314 pp.
Montecassino and Benevento in the Middle Ages. Essays in South Italian Church History (Variorum Collected Studies Series, Aldershot 2000), xi + 334 pp.
The Age of Robert Guiscard: Southern Italy and the Norman Conquest ( Harlow: Longman/Pearson Education 2000), xii + 329 pp.
The Society of Norman Italy, edited by G.A. Loud & A. Metcalfe ( Leiden: Brill, 2002), xx + 347 pp.
The Latin Church in Norman Italy (Cambridge University Press 2007), xviii + 577 pp.
The Crusade of Frederick Barbarossa. The History of the Expedition of the Emperor Frederick and Related Texts (Ashgate: Crusader Texts in Translation 19, 2010), xv + 225 pp.
Roger II and the Creation of the Kingdom of Sicily (Manchester Medieval Sources, 2012), 389 pp.
The Making of Medieval History, ed. G.A. Loud and Martial Staub (York Medieval Press / Boydell and Brewer 2017), xvi + 240 pp.
The Origins of the German Principalities 1100–1350, ed. G.A. Loud and Jochen Schenck (Routledge 2017), xlii + 399 pp.
The Chronicle of  Arnold of Lübeck (Routledge: Crusade Texts in Translation, 2019), xiv + 320 pp.
Pergamene scelte della badia di Cava, 1097-1200 (Centro europeo di studi normanni, Ariano Irpino, 2021), 404 pp.
The Social World of the Abbey of Cava, c. 1020-1300 (Boydell and Brewer 2021), xxxiii + 417 pp.

References

External links
 Prof Graham A. Loud, School of History / University of Leeds
 Professor Graham A. Loud, Resources for the Study of the Crusades

1953 births
Academics of the University of Leeds
Alumni of Christ Church, Oxford
Alumni of Merton College, Oxford
British medievalists
Historians of Italy
Living people
Place of birth missing (living people)